The North, Central American and Caribbean section of the 2022 FIFA World Cup qualification acted as the qualifiers for the 2022 FIFA World Cup, to be held in Qatar, for national teams which are members of the Confederation of North, Central American and Caribbean Association Football (CONCACAF). Three direct slots and one inter-confederation play-off slot in the final tournament were available for CONCACAF teams.

Format

Original format
On 10 July 2019, CONCACAF announced a restructured qualifying format for the World Cup. After CONCACAF initially announced in March 2018 that they would use the CONCACAF Ranking Index to determine the seeding of CONCACAF teams for qualifying to international tournaments, it was determined that FIFA Rankings would be used instead.
Top-seeded Hexagonal group: The top 6 ranked CONCACAF teams based on the FIFA rankings of June 2020 were to play home-and-away round-robin matches in one single group (often referred to as the "Hexagonal"). The top three teams would have qualified for the World Cup, and the fourth-placed team would have advanced to the CONCACAF play-off round.
Lower-seeded group stage and knockout stage: The remaining CONCACAF teams (ranked 7 to 35 based on the FIFA rankings of June 2020) were to be divided into eight groups (five groups of four teams and three groups of three teams) to play home-and-away round-robin matches. The winners of each group would have advanced to a knockout stage, consisting of the quarter-finals, semi-finals and final to be played in a two-legged home-and-away series. The winner of the knockout stage would have also advanced to the CONCACAF play-off round.
Play-off round: The fourth-placed team of the Hexagonal group would have faced the winner of the knockout stage in order to advance to the inter-confederation play-offs.

However, on 25 June 2020, following FIFA's decision to postpone the September 2020 international window because of the COVID-19 pandemic, CONCACAF noted that "the challenges presented by postponements to the football calendar, and the incomplete FIFA rankings cycle in our confederation, means our current World Cup qualifying process has been compromised and will be changed."

New format
On 27 July 2020, CONCACAF announced a new qualifying format for the World Cup.

First round: 30 CONCACAF teams, ranked 6 to 35 based on the FIFA rankings of July 2020, were drawn into six groups of five and played single round-robin matches (two home and two away), with group winners qualifying for the second round.
Second round: Six first round group winners played in a two-legged home-and-away series. The three winners advanced to the third round.
Third round: Eight teams, three second round winners and top five CONCACAF teams based on those FIFA rankings, played home-and-away round-robin matches in one single group. The top three teams qualified for the World Cup, and the fourth-placed team advanced to the inter-confederation play-offs.

Entrants
All 35 FIFA-affiliated national teams from CONCACAF originally entered qualification. Teams were seeded based on their July 2020 FIFA rankings. However, Saint Lucia later withdrew, reducing the total number of teams to 34.

W Later withdrew

Schedule
On 25 June 2020, FIFA announced that the inter-confederation play-offs, originally scheduled to be played in March 2022, were moved to June 2022, and that the June 2021 window would be extended from two matchdays to four for CONCACAF. On 8 September 2020, CONCACAF announced that the matches scheduled for October and November 2020 would be rescheduled to 2021. On 4 December 2020, FIFA announced that the September 2021, October 2021, January 2022 and March 2022 windows in the FIFA International Match Calendar would each be extended by one day to allow for three matchdays to be played per window. On the same day, CONCACAF announced the revised qualification schedule, which was updated on 16 June 2021.

First round

The six highest ranked teams of the first round were pre-seeded into groups A through F. Teams in their groups played each other once, a total of four matches; two home and two away matches. The draw for the first round was held on 19 August 2020, 19:00 CEST (UTC+2), at the FIFA headquarters in Zürich. The top team from each group advanced to the second round. The COVID-19 pandemic caused many "home" games to be played at neutral venues.

Group A

Group B

Group C

Group D

Group E

Group F

Second round

The second round saw the six group winners from the first round playing in three home-and-away ties of predetermined pairings. The winners advanced to the third round.

Third round

As a result of CONCACAF's revision to their World Cup qualifying format, the traditional Hexagonal with six teams and ten games per team was expanded to eight teams and fourteen games per team for the final and decisive round. The top five CONCACAF teams in the July 2020 FIFA rankings entered in the third round, joining the three winners of the second round. The draw to determine the schedule for the third round was held on 19 August 2020, 19:00 CEST (UTC+2), at the FIFA headquarters in Zürich.

Inter-confederation play-off

The inter-confederation play-off was determined by a draw held on 26 November 2021. The fourth-placed team from CONCACAF third round was drawn against the representative team from the OFC. The play-off was played as a single match in Qatar on 14 June 2022.

Qualified teams
The following four teams from CONCACAF qualified for the final tournament.

1 Italic indicates hosts for that year.

Top goalscorers

Links to the lists of goalscorers for each round are below:

First round
Second round
Third round

References

External links

Qualifiers – North, Central America and Caribbean, FIFA.com
Men's World Cup Qualifying, CONCACAF.com

 
Concacaf
2022
2020–21 in CONCACAF football
2021–22 in CONCACAF football